Aggborough & Spennells is an electoral ward in Kidderminster, Wyre Forest, England. The ward elects three councillors to both Wyre Forest District Council and Kidderminster Town Council. The population of the ward at the 2011 census was 8,779.

Governance 
Aggborough & Spennells is in the parliamentary constituency of Wyre Forest. Currently all three councillors: Helen Dyke, Peter Dyke & John Aston are all independent.

References 

Wyre Forest District